Talvar or Telvar may refer to:
 Talvar, Hormozgan (طالوار - Ţālvār)
 Talvar, Howmeh, Minab County, Hormozgan Province (تلوار - Talvār)
 Telvar, Kurdistan (تلوار - Telvār)